Superstar is a 2008 Indian drama film directed by Rohit Jugraj, starring Kunal Khemu in a double-role, opposite Tulip Joshi.

Plot

Superstar is based on the reality of the entertainment field. Life's essentially about choices. Kunal Mehra (Kunal Khemu) defines the youth of today — he dares: Dares to dream of making it big in Bollywood one day. Kunal wears the tag of a Bollywood struggler lightly, as he knows it is only a matter of time before he makes it into the big league. Until life decides to play a prank on him. The entry of the rich, debonair, Karan (Khemu), in Bollywood as well as his life, crushes all of Kunal's dreams. And suddenly the struggler is transformed into a superstar. Public adulation and unwavering media attention, he receives it all. What will Kunal choose at the moment of reckoning? Truth or dare?

Cast
 Kunal Khemu as Kunal Mehra / Karan Saxena (double role)
 Tulip Joshi as Mausam 
 Aushima Sawhney as Barkha
 Darshan Jariwala as M. G. Saxena, Karan's father 
 Sharat Saxena as Purabi Abhiram Mehra, Kunal's father
 Reema Lagoo as Kusum Mehra, Kunal's mother
 Kishori Shahane as Mrs. Saxena, Karan's mother 
 Vrajesh Hirjee as Mishra
 Zafar Karachiwala as Prashant
 Aman Verma as Vicky
 Anjan Srivastav as Sharmaji
 Sanjay Dutt in a special appearance as himself

Reception
The film opened to mixed reviews, mostly negative. Kunal Kemmu's acting was highly praised by the critics. Taran Adarsh from Bollywood Hungama rated it 2/5, and said, "On the whole, Superstar is a strictly average fare." Rajeev Masand gave the film the same rating and concluded it as "a film that could have been so much more", although he noted that it should be given a chance. The Times of India gave it 3 stars out of 5 and wrote, "Watch the film for its moments and its performances. Director Rohit Jugraj (he directed James) handles the emotional sequences with great restraint, while Kunal Khemu touches your heart in both the roles." Rediff.com's reviewer Ameeta Gupta dismissed it as an average film. Baradwaj Rangan wrote, "I didn’t mind Super Star in general – a few scenes are nicely done, and more than a few lines have the polish that comes only from being carefully thought over – but I wish Jugraj had made up his mind about what he wanted to do."Khalid Mohamed from Hindustan Times 
wrote that "By the way, one of the two cinematographers’ names is credited as ‘Deadly’. Darshan Jariwalla as the creepy producer delivers the worst, hammy-clammy performance in his or anyone's career. Quotable dialogue includes the line, “This is not a motion picture..it’s a loose motion picture.” Really, really, really." Sify.com wrote that "Kunal is the lifeline of the show. His performance leaves you speechless! Tulip Joshi doesn't have much to do. Aushima Shwhney looks mature for Kunal. Darshan Jariwala is first-rate. Sharat Saxena leaves a mark, especially in the scene when Kunal comes visiting after the gruesome accident. Reema is good. Vrajesh Hirjee is effective. Zafar Karachiwala is a fine actor. Kishori Shahane deserved a better role. Anjan Srivastava gets a few scenes, which he performs well. Aman Verma too deserved a better part."

The film performed poorly at the box office.

Soundtracks
All tracks were composed by Shamir Tandon with lyrics written by Vibha Singh and Shabbir Ahmed.

References

External links
 

2000s Hindi-language films
2008 films
Films directed by Rohit Jugraj Chauhan
Films scored by Shamir Tandon
Films about Bollywood